Penrhos Country Park (also known as Penrhos Coastal Park) is a country park near Holyhead, on the island of Anglesey in Wales, United Kingdom. The park attracts approximately 100,000 visitors each year. It was opened in 1971 on the former Penrhos estate which was formerly owned by the Stanley family and at the time of opening the Anglesey Aluminium company.

It is adjacent to the A55, on the Anglesey Coastal Path and also adjoins Beddmanarch Bay.
Parts of the park are a Site of Special Scientific Interest (SSSI) and Area of Outstanding Natural Beauty (AONB).

In 2016, Isle of Anglesey County Council gave planning permission to Land and Lakes for a holiday village development in the park. As mitigation, Land and Lakes would develop a nature reserve at nearby Cae Glas. Part of the financial case for development is to provide accommodation for workers at any new nuclear development at Wylfa nuclear power station, and as of 2022 development had not started.

The park was voted "UK's Favourite Park 2022" in a poll organised by the charity Fields in Trust.

References

External links
 Penrhos Coastal Park, The Woodland Trust
 The park's page at the Anglesey Heritage website
 Save Penrhos Coastal Park

Country parks in Wales
Parks in Anglesey
Holyhead
Protected areas established in 1971
1971 establishments in Wales